An election to Cavan County Council took place on 10 June 1999 as part of that year's Irish local elections. 25 councillors were elected from four local electoral areas by PR-STV voting for a five-year term of office.

Results by party

Results by Electoral Area

Bailieborough

Ballyjamesduff

Belturbet

Cavan

External links
 Official website

1999 Irish local elections
1999